Pukkelpop 2008 was a music festival that took place on the plains beside the Kempische Steenweg in Kiewit, Belgium, located near the city of Hasselt, on the 14th, 15th, and 16 August.

Metallica, The Killers, and Sigur Rós headlined the event, which also saw appearances from acts such as The Flaming Lips, Hot Chip, Within Temptation, Erol Alkan, Manic Street Preachers, MGMT, and Crystal Castles. Belgian electro band Soulwax brought the festival to a close, performing on the Main Stage on the final night.

This year saw the introduction of a new indoor stage, The Shelter. It replaced the Skate Stage, the event's second outdoor stage and a festival mainstay for the past decade. The new setting still focused on punk and metal acts, with Soulfly, Meshuggah, and Killswitch Engage closing the stage on each of the three nights respectively.

The event was attended by 152,000 people, a record number for the festival at the time.

Line-up

Thursday, August 14

Friday, August 15

Saturday, August 16

External links
 Official website for 2008 edition
 Official website for current edition

Pukkelpop
2008 in Belgium
2008 in music
2008 music festivals